Immortals Fenyx Rising (originally known as Gods and Monsters) is an action-adventure video game developed by Ubisoft Quebec and published by Ubisoft. The game was released for Nintendo Switch, PlayStation 4, PlayStation 5, Stadia, Windows, Xbox One, Xbox Series X/S, on December 3, 2020, and for Amazon Luna on December 4, 2020 to favorable reviews.

The game tells the story, as narrated by Prometheus to Zeus, of Fenyx, a mortal who in order to rescue Fenyx's brother must stop the evil Typhon after his escape from the underworld.

Gameplay 
Immortals is an action-adventure video game played from a third-person perspective. At the beginning of the game, players can customize the gender (though Fenyx is canonically female), voice, and the appearance of Fenyx. After unlocking the Hall of Gods, the player can use Aphrodite's Beauty Chair to make further changes at any point in the game. The game is set in a large open world consisting of seven distinct regions inspired by the Greek gods. The player is accompanied by Phosphor, a bird who can identify locations of interest on the map. Fenyx can traverse the world quickly through climbing cliffs, riding on a mount, and flying using the wings of Daedalus. The full open world is accessible from the start of the game. As players explore the world, they encounter rifts which teleport them to the Vaults of Tartaros, which are a series of platforming challenges that require players to utilize both Fenyx's combat and traversal abilities. Players can complete various side-objectives and optional puzzles.

The world of the Golden Isle is occupied with various enemies inspired by Greek mythology, including minotaurs to cyclopes. There are two modes of melee attack: fast and weak light attacks with a sword and slow and strong heavy attacks with an axe. Fenyx can use bow and arrows to defeat enemies. Players need to manage Fenyx's stamina during combat as they will become exhausted after repeated attacks. As players progress in the game, they can unlock powerful godlike abilities. For instance, Fenyx can unlock Ares' Wrath, a group of spears that thrust enemies into the air. Armor and weapons can be upgraded by collecting sufficient crafting resources.

Story 
After spending eons imprisoned under a mountain by Zeus, Typhon escapes and takes his revenge on the Olympian gods, severing them from their godly essences and robbing them of their powers. Zeus flees and meets Prometheus, seeking to secure his aid in battling Typhon. Prometheus instead makes a wager with Zeus that if Typhon can be beaten by a mortal, then he will be freed from his imprisonment. Prometheus uses his power of foresight to tell the story of Fenyx.

Fenyx, a young Greek shield-bearer of the Delian League, survives a shipwreck and washes up on the Golden Isle. She is shocked to find that the surviving crew and the Golden Isle's residents have all turned to stone. After recovering several artifacts belonging to legendary Greek heroes and receiving a prophecy, Fenyx rescues a young stranger who later turns out to be Hermes. He informs her about the situation and the grave threat Typhon poses as he seeks to break the barrier between the mortal realm and Tartaros and reform the world in his own image. Determined to stop Typhon and save humanity, Fenyx agrees to venture out into the Golden Isle to restore the deposed Olympian gods. Through their efforts, Fenyx befriends a magical bird companion named Phosphor and manages to restore Aphrodite (who became a tree without her passion), Ares (who turned into a rooster without pride), Hephaistos (who became one of his automatons without suffering), and Athena (who turned into a child with no judgment). Fenyx defeats the spirits of Achilles, Atalanta, Herakles, and Odysseus, who had all been corrupted by Typhon.

Despite the gods having been restored, they revert to their usual bickering and infighting when they cannot agree on a plan to stop Typhon. Fenyx's older brother Ligyron, who escaped the petrification curse, arrives and tells the gods of his plan to steal Hephaistos' chains from Typhon, enchant them using the blood of the gods, and use them to imprison Typhon once again. The gods agree to Ligyron's plan, but Fenyx is frustrated that he refuses to bring her along in order to protect him from danger. The gods encourage Fenyx to go after Ligyron so as not to let him steal the glory Fenyx deserves.

Fenyx scales the mountain at the center of the Golden Isle and manages to witness Ligyron collaborating with Typhon, collecting all the ingredients necessary to create a poison capable of killing the gods. In return, Typhon will allow Ligyron to become a god in his new world and rule the Golden Isle. Fenyx confronts Ligyron and defeats him, forcing Ligyron to flee to Tartaros. Fenyx follows him and confronts Typhon himself, being able to best him in battle. With his last breath, Typhon reveals that Fenyx is actually a demigod and Hermes' child.

Throughout the story, Zeus comes to realize how much he has mistreated his children and the other gods and becomes regretful at how he had become such a poor parent and husband. He interrupts the story when he hears Fenyx is supposed to be Hermes' child, pointing out it should not be possible. Prometheus admits that he had manipulated and fabricated parts of the story. He arranged his Titan brother Atlas to free Typhon and shipwreck Fenyx on the Golden Isle. In addition, he hid details that Fenyx is actually one of Zeus' children and that in reality, Typhon told him that it was Zeus who turned all of humanity to stone. At that moment, Fenyx arrives with Typhon's poison, confirming the entire story was part of Prometheus' plot to have Zeus killed.

Zeus admits that even though he created them, he wanted to destroy humanity due to their flaws, but has come to realize that humanity's flaws are merely a reflection of the flaws the gods and he himself possess as well. He feels he does not deserve to live and does not put up any resistance. Fenyx reveals she does not have any intention of killing Zeus, wanting instead to inspire him to be a better father to his children and a better god. Typhon reappears, furious that Fenyx will not kill Zeus as planned. He consumes the poison to empower himself and captures Zeus, taunting Fenyx to come and try to stop him. Fenyx follows Typhon back to Tartaros and battles him again, but Typhon manages to slay Phosphor and Fenyx begins to lose ground against him until Zeus escapes and rallies the other gods to come to Fenyx's aid. Working together, they are able to defeat Typhon once and for all as he succumbs to the poison he consumed.

Afterward, as a reward for helping defeat Typhon, Zeus agrees to return humanity to normal, restores Phosphor as a new creature, the phoenix, and invites Fenyx to live on the Golden Isle with the gods. Fenyx agrees, as long as she gets to keep an eye on Zeus to make sure he is committed to becoming a better god and father. Meanwhile, Zeus sends Ligyron to free Prometheus as part of the wager, but not before tormenting Prometheus by having Ligyron tell his own story of Fenyx, much to Prometheus' annoyance.

Development
Immortals Fenyx Rising was developed by Ubisoft Quebec, the team which created Assassin's Creed Odyssey. Game director Scott Phillips added that the project originated from a software bug the team discovered during the development of Odyssey, which changed the humans on the player's crew into giant cyclopses, and decided that it would be a good idea to create a separate game that embraces the mythological side of Greece. Due to the positive reception of Odyssey, Ubisoft's management agreed to greenlight the project.

The game was announced as Gods and Monsters during E3 2019. Initially set to be released on February 26, 2020, the game was delayed in October 2019 after another Ubisoft tentpole release, Tom Clancy's Ghost Recon Breakpoint, failed to be commercially successful. According to Ubisoft, the delay gave additional time for the development team to "ensure that their respective innovations are perfectly implemented so as to deliver optimal experiences for players." Quebec studio used the additional time to add Zeus and Prometheus as the game's duo narrators, replacing Greek poet Homer, who was initially intended to fulfill this role. A work-in-progress build of the game was leaked on Stadia under the codename Orpheus in June 2020. It was re-revealed as Immortals Fenyx Rising on September 10, 2020. The studio decided to rename the game to reflect its narrative focus and put more emphasis on Fenyx, the game's protagonist. The change appeared to be a result from a trademark dispute with Monster Energy, which challenged the Gods and Monsters name, believing it would cause confusion.

Jeffrey Yohalem, who wrote for previous Ubisoft titles such as Assassin's Creed II, Far Cry 3, and Child of Light, served as narrative director and lead writer for the game. The humour of the game – particularly that involving the bickering between the narrators Zeus and Prometheus – was inspired by films such as Robin Hood: Men in Tights, The Princess Bride, and The Naked Gun. In regards to adaptating Greek mythology for modern audiences, Yohalem explained that he did not want to avoid the darker aspects of its gods and heroes (providing the example of Theseus's kidnapping of Helen of Troy), and instead wanted to specifically highlight those elements through a modern perspective, as it "[speaks] to our current political climate and who we are as human beings on social media." Yohalem believed that the capability of Greek gods and heroes to commit evil acts made them more human, saying that "[the] Greeks believed in balance where what makes us human and makes us complete are both our strengths and weaknesses."

Gareth Coker, who previously worked on Ori and the Blind Forest and its sequel Ori and the Will of the Wisps, composed the score for the game. Ancient Greek instruments such as lyre and kithara were used when he was recording the music. Coker commissioned these instruments from a Greek luthier and had them transported across the Atlantic.

The game was released on December 3, 2020 for Nintendo Switch, PlayStation 4, PlayStation 5, Stadia, Windows, Xbox One, and Xbox Series X/S. A free demo for the game was released for Stadia users before the game's official launch. A version for Amazon Luna released the following day. The first of three DLC packs for the game, A New God, was released on January 28, 2021. This story arc is set in Olympos, there Fenyx must overcome the trials from the Gods to earn a place among the Gods. The second DLC pack, Myths of the Eastern Realm was released on March 25, 2021. Based on Chinese mythology, the player plays as Ku, a brave new hero that must help the Goddess Nuwa to restore the balance between Heaven and Earth. The final DLC pack, The Lost Gods, was released on April 22, 2021. In this story arc, the players plays as Ash, a new hero on an epic journey to reunite the Greek Gods including Poseidon and Hades, and bring them back to the Pantheon.

Reception

Immortals Fenyx Rising received "generally favorable" reviews, according to review aggregator Metacritic. Its narrative, humor, combat, progression-systems, soundtrack, and open world-design received praise. Criticism was directed towards its lack of innovation, with many critics and players criticizing its similarities to The Legend of Zelda: Breath of the Wild.

References

External links
 

2020 video games
Action-adventure games
Ancient Greece in fiction
Nintendo Switch games
Open-world video games
PlayStation 4 games
PlayStation 5 games
Single-player video games
Stadia games
Ubisoft games
Video games adapted into comics
Video games based on Greek mythology
Video games developed in Canada
Video games featuring protagonists of selectable gender
Video games scored by Gareth Coker
Video games set in Greece
Video games set on fictional islands
Video games with downloadable content
Windows games
Xbox One games
Xbox Series X and Series S games